John Cuthbert may refer to:

John Cuthbert (Royal Navy officer) (1902–1987), British admiral
John Cuthbert (athlete) (1894–1960), Canadian athlete
John Alfred Cuthbert (1788–1881), American politician

See also
Jack Cuthbert, rugby player